The Joseph Smith Papers, a documentary television series produced by Ronald O. Barney and the Larry H. Miller Communications Corporation, premiered on KJZZ-TV in the Salt Lake City market. The series consists of a total of 94 episodes produced in two seasons; the episodes are approximately 30 minutes long each (with the exception of the 55 minute pilot). The first season consists of 51 episodes, plus the pilot, while the second season has 42 episodes.

The series pilot aired November 5, 2007, but the first season did not begin airing until early in 2008; it concluded on February 22, 2009. The second season began airing soon after the first season's finale in 2009; it ended later that same year. Following the completion of each season, the episodes were rebroadcast on BYU-TV (to receive exposure outside the Salt Lake City market). Both seasons were later released on region-all DVD.

Series overview

Episode list
The first column refers to the episode's number in the overall series.
The second column refers to the episode's number in that particular season.

Season 1: 2008–2009

Season 2: 2009

Notes

Lists of American non-fiction television series episodes
Works about Joseph Smith